Orchesella pannonica is a species of slender springtail in the family Entomobryidae. It can be found in Romania, Austria, Hungary, and Yugoslavia.

References

Collembola
Articles created by Qbugbot
Animals described in 1960